Spy Game is a 2001 American action thriller film directed by Tony Scott.

Spy Game or Spy Games may also refer to:

 Spy Game (soundtrack), the soundtrack album to the film
 Spy Game (TV series), a 1997 American action TV series
 Spy Games, a 1999 American action film
 Spy Games (TV series), a 2020 American reality TV series
 Spy Games: Elevator Mission, a 2007 Japanese video game
 "Spy Game" (Bluey), an episode of the first season of the animated TV series Bluey